Eric Woolfee is an actor, playwright, puppeteer, magician, and the Artistic Director of Eldritch Theatre, a Toronto theatre company specializing in horror plays using puppetry, live actors, and parlor magic.

Career
His work for Eldritch Theatre includes The Haunted Medicine Show, Madhouse Variations, The Babysitter, The Strange & Eerie Memoirs of Billy Wuthergloom, Dear Grendelmaus, and Sideshow of the Damned. Some of his credits include, The Comedy of Errors (Humber River Shakespeare), The Last Christmas Turkey (Touchmark Theatre), Rocket & the Queen of Dreams (Roseneath Theatre), Little Shop of Horrors (Canstage), Timon in Disney's The Lion King.

Nominations and Credits
Eric Woolfe has been nominated for over a dozen Dora Mavor Moore Awards as both an actor and playwright. He is a three-time nominee for the prestigious KM Hunter Memorial Award.

Other credits include Step Right Up!, and Twas, for Theatre Orangeville, Pomeranski Rex for The Toronto Fringe, and the film scripts Momento Mori, Hungry Dead Things, and Blackwood Hotel.

His film and TV credits include Defiance, Murdoch Mysteries, Haven, Doc, Due South, Traders, Beyblade, and, most notably, George Romero's modern zombie film, Survival of the Dead.

References

External links
 

Canadian puppeteers
Living people
Year of birth missing (living people)
Place of birth missing (living people)